Mario Andretti Racing is a video game that was released in 1994 on the Sega Genesis/Mega Drive. It was an early title in the newly created EA Sports line, and was developed by Stormfront Studios. The game was produced by famed sports game developer Scott Orr as part of his collaboration with Richard Hilleman in the creation of EA Sports. Race driver Mario Andretti personally guided the development of the AI used by the non-player drivers in stock cars, Indy style open wheel racing, and dirt track racing.

The game uses different physics and AI for three kinds of racing.

The success of Mario Andretti Racing led Orr and Hilleman to work with Stormfront to launch the highly successful NASCAR Racing series.

In 1996, EA Sports released another game starring Andretti, called Andretti Racing, for the Sega Saturn and PlayStation. A PC version for Microsoft Windows followed in 1997.

Reviews
FLUX (Apr, 1994)
Electronic Gaming Monthly (Jun, 1994)
Game Players (Jul, 1994)
GamePro (Aug, 1994)
Sega Force (Aug 10, 1994)
Aktueller Software Markt (Sep, 1994)
Mean Machines (Sep, 1994)

References

1994 video games
Electronic Arts games
Racing video games
Sega Genesis games
Sega Genesis-only games
Stormfront Studios games
Video games based on real people
Andretti
Andretti
Andretti
Video games developed in the United States